is the 29th single by Zard, released 16 June 1999 under the B-Gram Records label. As with their previous singles Atarashii Door and Good Day, this single doesn't include an alternate song. The single debuted at #2 the first week. It charted for nine weeks and sold over 201,000 copies. This marked the 24th consecutive single by ZARD, since Makenaide, which reached the top three in the Oricon rankings.

Track list
All songs are written by Izumi Sakai.

composer: Yuuichirou Iwai (New Cinema Tokage)/arrangement: Akihito Tokunaga, Hirohito Furui and 4D-JAM
 (original karaoke)

References

1999 singles
Zard songs
Songs written by Izumi Sakai